Miloud Rebiaï (born 12 December 1993 in Tlemcen) is an Algerian footballer  who plays for CR Belouizdad in the Algerian Ligue Professionnelle 1.

Career
On 24 March 2012 Rebiaï made his professional debut for WA Tlemcen, coming on a substitute in a league match against MC Saïda.
In 2019, he signed a contract with MC Alger.
In 2022, he joined CR Belouizdad.

References

External links
 
 

1993 births
Algerian footballers
Algerian Ligue Professionnelle 1 players
Algerian Ligue 2 players
Algeria youth international footballers
ES Sétif players
Living people
People from Tlemcen
WA Tlemcen players
Footballers at the 2016 Summer Olympics
Olympic footballers of Algeria
Association football fullbacks
21st-century Algerian people